Adrian David Houser (born February 2, 1993) is an American professional baseball pitcher for the Milwaukee Brewers of Major League Baseball (MLB). He made his MLB debut in 2015.

Career

Houston Astros
The Houston Astros of Major League Baseball (MLB) selected Houser in the second round, 69th overall, of the 2011 MLB Draft. Dylan Bundy and Archie Bradley, with whom Houser had played baseball before high school, had been selected earlier in the draft. Although he had previously committed to playing college baseball for the Oklahoma Sooners, Houser signed a contract with Houston three days after he was drafted and was subsequently assigned to the Rookie-level Gulf Coast League (GCL) Astros. After six GCL games in which he went 1–2 with a 4.03 ERA and 25 strikeouts, the Astros organization promoted Houser to the Greeneville Astros of the Appalachian League, their other Rookie ball team. Between the two teams, Houser went 2–4 in his first season of professional baseball, with a 4.31 ERA and 44 strikeouts in 12 games and 48 innings pitched. Houser spent the entire 2012 season with Greeneville as well, going 3–4 in 11 starts with a 4.19 ERA and 54 strikeouts in 58 innings.

Houser spent 2013 with the Tri-City ValleyCats where he pitched to an 0–4 record and a 3.42 ERA in 14 games (nine starts), and 2014 with the Quad Cities River Bandits where he went 5–6 with a 4.14 ERA in 25 games, 17 being starts. He started 2015 with the Lancaster JetHawks and was promoted to the Corpus Christi Hooks.

Milwaukee Brewers
On July 30, 2015, Houser, along with Brett Phillips, Domingo Santana and Josh Hader, were traded to the Milwaukee Brewers for Carlos Gómez and Mike Fiers. Milwaukee assigned him to the Biloxi Shuckers. In 26 games (20 starts) between Lancaster, Corpus Christi and Biloxi, he compiled a 7–5 record with a 4.43 ERA.

Houser was promoted to Milwaukee for the annual September call-ups. He made his major league debut on September 26, 2015. In 2016, Houser spent all of the season with Biloxi, going 3–7 with a 5.25 ERA in 13 starts. Houser's 2017 season was limited due to injury, and he pitched only 17.2 innings all season. He began 2018 with Biloxi.

Houser was recalled to the Brewers' major league roster on June 17, 2018, and pitched during the team's game against the Philadelphia Phillies later that day. He also vomited twice on the mound during the game. This would be the first of several occurrences where Houser vomited during a game. On August 11, 2019, in a game against the Texas Rangers, Houser misfielded a ground ball hit at him by Elvis Andrus. Shortly after, Houser walked towards the back of the mound, where he vomited, the second such time Houser had vomited on the mound during a game. After this, he proceeded to notch ten strikeouts and finish the game as the winning pitcher. In 2019 for Milwaukee, Houser appeared in 35 games, pitching to a 6–7 record and a 3.72 ERA with 117 strikeouts in 111.1 innings pitched. In 2020, Houser recorded a 5.30 ERA and 1-6 record with 44 strikeouts in 56.0 innings of work across 12 games.

On April 27, 2021, Houser hit his first major league home run off of Daniel Castano of the Miami Marlins. In a game against the Marlins on May 8, Houser hit his second career home run, also off of Castano. Houser's salary for the 2022 season was decided via the arbitration process; he had asked for $3 million, and received $2.425 million. In 2022 he was 6-10	with a 4.73 ERA, and had the lowest LOB percentage in the majors (60.8%).

On November 18, 2022, Houser signed a one-year, $3.6 million contract with the Brewers, avoiding arbitration.

Personal life 
Houser is married to Megan Houser. Houser is the nephew of James Knott, a pitcher who was selected by the New York Mets in the 11th round of the 1992 MLB Draft. His older brother Michael played college baseball for Northeastern State. Houser is of Cherokee descent and is a member of the Cherokee Nation. He is close friends with fellow Cherokee Nation member and MLB pitcher Ryan Helsley.

References

External links

1993 births
Living people
People from Locust Grove, Oklahoma
Baseball players from Oklahoma
Major League Baseball pitchers
Milwaukee Brewers players
Gulf Coast Astros players
Greeneville Astros players
Tri-City ValleyCats players
Quad Cities River Bandits players
Lancaster JetHawks players
Corpus Christi Hooks players
Biloxi Shuckers players
Colorado Springs Sky Sox players
Salt River Rafters players
San Antonio Missions players
Surprise Saguaros players
Nashville Sounds players